The 1985 Hewlett-Packard Trophy was a women's tennis tournament played on indoor carpet courts in Hilversum, Netherlands. It was part of the 1985 Virginia Slims World Championship Series and was played from 4 November until 10 November 1985. Unseeded Katerina Maleeva won the singles title.

Finals

Singles
 Katerina Maleeva defeated  Carina Karlsson 6–3, 6–2
 It was  Maleeva's 2nd singles title of the year and of her career.

Doubles
 Marcella Mesker /  Catherine Tanvier defeated  Sandra Cecchini /  Sabrina Goleš 6–2, 6–2

References

External links
 ITF tournament edition details

Hewlett-Packard Trophy
1985 in Dutch women's sport